Hirokazu Higashira (born 7 September 1946) is a Japanese equestrian. He competed at the 1976 Summer Olympics and the 1992 Summer Olympics.

References

1946 births
Living people
Japanese male equestrians
Olympic equestrians of Japan
Equestrians at the 1976 Summer Olympics
Equestrians at the 1992 Summer Olympics
Sportspeople from Kyoto